SAMR may refer to:

 State Administration for Market Regulation, the Chinese government's department for market controls
 United States Marine Corps Squad Advanced Marksman Rifle
 Substitution, Augmentation, Modification, Redefinition, a pedagogical model of technology integration